James Gordon Miller (born July 5, 1957) is a former American college and professional football player who was a punter in the National Football League (NFL) for eight seasons during the 1980s.  Miller played college football for the University of Mississippi, and received All-American honors.  He played professionally for the San Francisco 49ers, Dallas Cowboys, and New York Giants of the NFL.

Early years
Miller was born in Ripley, Mississippi and attended Ripley High School, where he played running back, wide receiver, cornerback and punter.

College career
Miller attended the University of Mississippi (Ole Miss), where he played for the Ole Miss Rebels football team from 1976 to 1979.  He started punting barefoot as a freshman (in high school he had to wear a shoe by rule), ranking third in the Southeastern Conference with a 40.5-yard punt average. For a while he doubled as a flanker and punter.

The next year, he led the NCAA with a 45.9-yard punting average, which was also a school and SEC record. As a junior, he finished with a 43.2-yard per punt average. In his last year he averaged 44.6-yards per punt. 

At the time he set school records with an 82-yard punt against South Carolina in 1976, punt average in a season (45.9), most punts in a game (12), career punt average (43.4-yard), punts in a career (266), punting yards in
a season (3,283 yards) and total punt yards in a career (11,549). He was inducted into the Ole Miss Athletics Hall of Fame in 1995. He was named to the Ole Miss Team of the Century (1893-1992).

Professional career

San Francisco 49ers
Miller was selected in the third round of the 1980 NFL Draft by the San Francisco 49ers, who had gone through three punters in three years. As a rookie, he was named to the All-rookie team after averaging 40.9 yards per punt. He was a part of the Super Bowl XVI championship team. He was waived before the start of the 1983 season, when he was passed on the depth chart by Tom Orosz.

Dallas Cowboys
On November 16, 1983, he was signed as a free agent by the Dallas Cowboys to replace the injured rookie John Warren. He only played in three games. He was released after losing the preseason competition with Warren on September 6, 1984.

New York Giants
In 1987, he punted in one game for the New York Giants, replacing an injured Sean Landeta. He was cut during the season the team won Super Bowl XXI.

He lives in Ripley, MS with his wife.

References

External links
October 16, 1978 Sports Illustrated: Ah! Those Punts Hit The Spot - Sports Illustrated feature on Jim Miller
Jim Miller: Barefoot Boy of the 49ers

1957 births
Living people
American football punters
Dallas Cowboys players
New York Giants players
Ole Miss Rebels football players
San Francisco 49ers players
All-American college football players
People from Ripley, Mississippi
Players of American football from Mississippi